Alberto Carlo Lolli was an Italian film director of the silent era. He made more than thirty films between 1909 and 1923.

Selected filmography
 The Vengeance of Jago (1912)

References

Bibliography
 Eddie Sammons. Shakespeare: A Hundred Years on Film. Scarecrow Press, 2004.

External links

1870s births
Year of death unknown
Italian film directors
Film people from Naples